Parchayee is a 2017 Pakistani drama serial that premiered on 22 December 2017 on Hum TV. It is directed by Asad Jabbal and written by Uzma Iftikhar. It stars Sabreen Hisbani, Minal Khan and Hammad Farooqui in lead roles. The serial is produced by Moomal Shunaid under their production company Moomal Productions with Rafay Rashdi as a managing partner.

Cast
Sabreen Hisbani as Saba
Minal Khan as Parizay "Pari"
Ahsan Mohsin Ikram as Haaris.
Hammad Farooqui as Saad
Asif Raza Mir as Khawar
Qavi Khan as Saad and Parizay's Grandfather
Fazila Kaiser as Rehana
Hira Hussain as Shiza (dead)
Arisha Razi as Sania

References

Pakistani drama television series
2017 Pakistani television series debuts
2018 Pakistani television series endings
Urdu-language television shows
Hum TV original programming